Gleb Maltsev (born 7 March 1988, in Pavlodar) is a Kazakhstan footballer currently playing for Kazakhstan Premier League club FC Ordabasy as a forward. He started his career at FC Kyzylzhar.

Club statistics
Last update: 28 October 2012

External links

1988 births
Living people
Kazakhstani footballers
Kazakhstan international footballers
Kazakhstan Premier League players
FC Kyzylzhar players
FC Irtysh Pavlodar players
Association football forwards
People from Pavlodar